The 1988 Yale Bulldogs football team represented Yale University in the 1988 NCAA Division I-AA football season.  The Bulldogs were led by 24th-year head coach Carmen Cozza, played their home games at the Yale Bowl and finished in fifth place in the Ivy League with a 3–3–1 record, 3–6–1 overall.

Schedule

References

Yale
Yale Bulldogs football seasons
Yale Bulldogs football